Sebastiane is a 1976 Latin-language British historical film directed by Derek Jarman and Paul Humfress and written by Jarman, Humfress and James Whaley. It portrays the events of the life of Saint Sebastian, including his iconic martyrdom by arrows. The film, which was aimed at a gay audience, was controversial for the homoeroticism portrayed between the soldiers and for having dialogue entirely in Latin.

Plot
In the third century AD, Sebastian is a member of the Emperor Diocletian's personal guard. When he tries to intervene to stop one of the Emperor's catamites from being strangled by one of his bodyguards, Sebastian is exiled to a remote coastal garrison and reduced in rank to private. Although thought to be an early Christian, Sebastian is a worshipper of the Roman sun god Phoebus Apollo and sublimates his desire for his male companions into worship of his deity and pacifism. Both incense Severus, the commanding officer of the garrison, who becomes increasingly obsessed with Sebastian, tries to assault him, and ultimately presides over his summary execution for refusing to take up arms in defence of the Roman Empire. Justin, one of his comrades in arms, is also in love with Sebastian, albeit necessarily unrequited, but he forms a friendship with the stubborn celibate pacifist. Adrian and Anthony, two of Sebastian's fellow soldiers, are gay and obviously in love with one another.

Cast

 Barney James as Severus
 Neil Kennedy as Maximus
 Leonardo Treviglio as Sebastian
 Richard Warwick as Justin
 Donald Dunham as Claudius
 Daevid Finbar as Julian
 Ken Hicks as Adrian
 Lindsay Kemp as Dancer
 Steffano Massari as Marius
 Janusz Romanov as Anthony
 Gerald Incandela as Leopard Boy
 Robert Medley as Emperor Diocletian

The emperor's guests included such notables as Peter Hinwood, Nell Campbell, and Patricia Quinn (all of Rocky Horror fame), Jordan, Philip Sayer, Charlotte Barnes, Nicholas de Jongh, Duggie Fields, Christopher Hobbs, Andrew Logan, and Johnny Rozsa.

Reception
Margaret Walters, author of The Nude Male, commented that Sebastiane, "where male nudes in various stages of ecstasy positively littered the screen", was "successfully aimed at a very specialized homosexual audience."

Home media

The film was released on DVD in the UK and the U.S. A Blu-ray disc was released in the U.S. on August 7, 2012.

See also
 List of historical drama films
 List of films set in ancient Rome

References

 Audio recording of Derek Jarman interviewed by Ken Campbell at the ICA, London, 7 February 1984

External links

 

1976 films
1976 drama films
1976 LGBT-related films
British drama films
British LGBT-related films
Latin-language films
Films directed by Derek Jarman
Films about Christianity
Films set in ancient Rome
Films set in the Roman Empire
Films set in the 3rd century
Films shot in England
Films shot in Sardinia
Gay-related films
Saint Sebastian in art
LGBT and Catholicism
1976 directorial debut films
1970s British films